The Brooks Round Barn was a historical building located near Nashua in rural Floyd County, Iowa, United States. It was built in 1914 by Emil Cable, with Dale Butler as the supervisor. The building was a true round barn that measured  in diameter.  It was constructed of clay tile and featured a two-pitch roof and a  central clay tile silo. The interior featured stanchions around the silo on the ground floor, double horse stalls and grain bins in a circular arrangement on the main floor, and a hayloft. The barn was listed on the National Register of Historic Places in 1986.  It was destroyed in 1995.

References

Infrastructure completed in 1914
Buildings and structures in Floyd County, Iowa
Barns on the National Register of Historic Places in Iowa
Round barns in Iowa
National Register of Historic Places in Floyd County, Iowa